Promicromonosporaceae is an Actinomycete family.

Phylogeny
The currently accepted taxonomy is based on the List of Prokaryotic names with Standing in Nomenclature and the phylogeny is based on whole-genome sequences.

Notes

References

Micrococcales
Soil biology